Esra Ronabar (born 19 July 1978) is a Turkish actress.

Life and career 
Ronabar was born in 1978 in Ödemiş. She studied chemistry at Ankara University, but soon started taking acting courses. Altan Erkekli was among his teachers. She then briefly worked with Rutkay Aziz and Metin Balay. Ronabar graduated from School of Language and History – Geography with a degree in theatre studies. Between 1997–1998, she worked for Ankara Art Theatre and had roles in the plays Elmadaki Barış and Küçük Karabalık. In an adaptation of the play Akrep written by Eşber Yağmurdereli and directed by Rutkay Aziz, she worked with Ebru Erkekli as an assistant director. In 1998, she made her television debut with Kader Ayırsa Bile in leading role alongside Ümit Olcay.

Ronabar played in 7 commercials for different brands, including Ülker Cream Chocolate and Alldays. In 2003, she played the role of Cansu in A.G.A. In the same year, she was noted for he role in Bir İstanbul Masalı as Birnur Goyalı. In 2005, she was cast in Beyaz Gelincik, portraying the character of Bahar, a children's doctor. In the same year, she appeared in the Son Osmanlı series.

Ronabar married actor Barış Falay in July 2006.

In 2007, she had a role in the drama movie Hayattan Korkma, directed and written by Berrin Dağçınar. Between 2007–2008, she joined Kocaeli Metropolitan Municipality City Theatre and played roles in adaptations of The Servant of Two Masters and Oyun Nasıl Oynanmalı. With her role as Sevil in Oyun Nasıl Oynanmalı, written by Vasıf Öngören and directed by Ömer Akgüllü, she won the İsmet Küntay Judges Special Award at the 33rd İsmet Küntay Theatre Awards in 2008.

In 2009, her son Mavi Rüzgâr was born.

In 2010, Ronabar portrayed the character of Şahane in the Küstüm Çiçeği series and began working for the Istanbul City Theatres in the same year. There she was among the cast of Les Liaisons dangereuses and Dünyanın Ortasında Bir Yer. With her role as Ahten in Dünyanın Ortasında Bir Yer, written by Özen Yula and directed by M. Nurullah Tuncer, she won the Best Actress award at the 36th İsmet Küntay Theatre Awards in 2011. In 2012, she played the role of a dealer named Nur Sertaç in Uçurum.

In 2013, Ronabar was cast in a leading role in the fantastic drama series Sana Bir Sır Vereceğim. After portraying the character of Sevgi Gündoğdu for 12 episodes, but suffered injuries in September 2013 in a car crash in Bahçeköy on her way to the filming set. Ronabar, who suffered many fractures during the crash, underwent a 5.5-hour operation. The platinum attached to her arm broke after another accident she had in January 2014 while she was about to recover. Due to these injuries, she was forced to leave the cast of Sana Bir Sır Vereceğim.

Theatre 
 Les Liaisons dangereuses : Choderlos de Laclos - Istanbul City Theatres - 2011
 Dünyanın Ortasında Bir Yer : Özen Yula - Istanbul City Theatres -  2010
 Oyun Nasıl Oynanmalı : Vasıf Öngören - Kocaeli Metropolitan Municipality City Theatre - 2008
 The Servant of Two Masters - Carlo Goldoni - Kocaeli Metropolitan Municipality City Theatre - 2007
 Karar Kimin (Whose Life Is It Anyway?) - Brian Clark - Kocaeli Metropolitan Municipality City Theatre - 2004
 Küçük Karabalık : Nilbanu Engindeniz - Ankara Art Theatre - 1997
 Elmadaki Barış : Samed Behrengi - Ankara Art Theatre - 1997

Filmography

Awards 
 2011: 36th İsmet Küntay Theatre Awards, "Best Actress" (Dünyanın Ortasında Bir Yer as Ahten)
 2008: 33rd İsmet Küntay Theatre Awards, "İsmet Küntay Judge Spacial Award" (Oyun Nasıl Oynanmalı as Sevil)

References

External links 
  
 

Living people
1978 births
Turkish stage actresses
Turkish television actresses
Turkish film actresses